Agata Maria Passent (born 4 February 1973) is a Polish journalist and writer.

Biography
Passent was born in Warsaw into a family with Jewish roots, as a daughter of a journalist Daniel Passent and a poet Agnieszka Osiecka. Her Jewish paternal grandparents were killed during the Holocaust in the Warsaw Ghetto. Her non-Jewish maternal grandparents – Wiktor Osiecki, a pianist and Maria Sztechman – survived World War II and lived in Saska Kępa. Passent, who spent her childhood in Falenica, came back to Warsaw with her family at the age of five. In 1979 they moved to Cambridge, then back to Warsaw and then to Newton, where she graduated from the Buckingham Browne & Nichols school. In 1995 Agata Passent graduated with a major in German studies from Harvard University and she returned to Poland.

In 1996 Passent debuted as a journalist in the Polish magazine, Twój Styl (En. Your Style). One year later, she founded The Okularnicy Foundation (En. The Nerds' Foundation), whose main purpose is to protect and popularise Agnieszka Osiecka's works. In the years 2005–2006 Passent was connected with Radio PiN and since 2006 she is writing feuilletons for the magazine Twoje Dziecko (En. Your Child).

Passent has been married twice: to Wojciech Borowski in 2001 and to Wojciech Kuczok, a writer, whom she married in 2013. She has a son, Jakub, with photographer Wojciech Wieteska. Passent is a member of the Jewish Community in Warsaw, but she describes herself as an atheist.

Books
Stacja Warszawa (Station Warsaw), 2007.
Jest fantastycznie (It's fantastic), 2004.
Miastówka, 2002.
Olbiński i opera (Olbiński and the opera), 2003.
Pałac wiecznie żywy (Long live the Palace), 2004.
Kto to Pani zrobił?, 2014.

External links 
 Agata Passent's blog (in Polish).

References

1973 births
20th-century Polish Jews
21st-century Polish Jews
Living people
Harvard University alumni
Jewish atheists
Polish atheists
Polish journalists
Polish women writers
Polish women journalists
Buckingham Browne & Nichols School alumni